The surname Cock is derived from the Dutch and Flemish surname de Cock, alternately found as de Cook or de Kok and can be Anglicanised as Cook, and comes from the occupation of a cook.

The name Cock is also a variant spelling of Cox, which is of Old English or Welsh origin, and developed independently of the Dutch and Flemish name.

Notable persons 
 Adam Gates (aka Bob C. Cock), composer, musician, Primus roadie and producer 
 Christopher Cock, auctioneer of the eighteenth century
 Edward Cock, British surgeon
 Gerald Cock, first director of BBC television
 Hieronymus Cock (also Kock), Flemish Renaissance painter and engraver
 Jack Cock (John Gilbert Cock), English footballer
 James Cock (1833–1901), politician in South Australia, son of Robert
 Martin Cock, stage name of American Head Charge singer Cameron Heacock
 Matthys Cock Flemish painter
 Robert Cock (1801–1871), colonist of South Australia
 Townsend D. Cock (1838–1913), New York politician
Quinton De Kock, South African Cricketer

See also 
 Cocks
 Cox
 Coxe
 Coxen
 Coxon

Surnames of Dutch origin